Strongylognathus testaceus is a species of slave-making ant in the subfamily Myrmicinae. The species is known from Europe and the Caucasus.

References

 eol.org
 itis.gov

External links

Strongylognathus
Slave-making ants
Insects described in 1852
Hymenoptera of Europe
Hymenoptera of Asia